Gregory T. Clifton (born February 6, 1968) is a former American football wide receiver in the National Football League for the Washington Redskins.  He played college football at Johnson C. Smith University and the Virginia Military Institute.

1968 births
Living people
Players of American football from Charlotte, North Carolina
American football wide receivers
Johnson C. Smith Golden Bulls football players
VMI Keydets football players
Washington Redskins players